Alikhan Lukmanovich Zhabrailov  (born 14 April 1994) is a Russian freestyle wrestler of Chechen ethnicity who competes at 97 and 92 kilograms. At 92, Zhabrailov was the 2020 Individual World Cup champion, a 2019 World Championship bronze medalist, the Golden Grand Prix Ivan Yarygin 2020 silver medalist and a two–time Russian National champion (2019 and 2020). In 2021, he made the move up to 97 kilos, and has claimed the 2021 European Continental Championship and the 2021 Russian National Championship. He also competed at 86 kilos earlier in his career, claiming the 2017 U23 World Championship.

Career 
At the 2017 World U23 Wrestling Championship held in Bydgoszcz, Poland, he won the gold medal in the 86 kg event.

In 2020, he won the gold medal in the men's 92 kg event at the Individual Wrestling World Cup held in Belgrade, Serbia.

Zhabrailov came in first at the 2021 European Wrestling Championships in the 97 kg event.

In 2022, he won the silver medal in his event at the Yasar Dogu Tournament held in Istanbul, Turkey.

Major results

Freestyle record 

! colspan="7"| Senior Freestyle Matches
|-
!  Res.
!  Record
!  Opponent
!  Score
!  Date
!  Event
!  Location
|-
! style=background:white colspan=7 |
|-
|Loss
|68–18
|align=left| Mohammad Hossein Mohammadian
|style="font-size:88%"|3–4
|style="font-size:88%" rowspan=4|26 February 2022
|style="font-size:88%" rowspan=4|2022 Yasar Dogu International
|style="text-align:left;font-size:88%;" rowspan=4|
 Istanbul, Turkey
|-
|Win
|68–17
|align=left| Kollin Moore
|style="font-size:88%"|8–2
|-
|Win
|67–17
|align=left| Shamil Musaev
|style="font-size:88%"|7–3
|-
|Win
|66–17
|align=left| Burak Şahin
|style="font-size:88%"|TF 10–0
|-
! style=background:white colspan=7 |
|-
|Win
|65–17
|align=left| Süleyman Karadeniz
|style="font-size:88%"|6–4
|style="font-size:88%" rowspan=3|19–20 April 2021
|style="font-size:88%" rowspan=3|2021 European Continental Championships
|style="text-align:left;font-size:88%;" rowspan=3|
 Warsaw, Poland
|-
|Win
|64–17
|align=left| Radosław Baran
|style="font-size:88%"|3–3
|-
|Win
|63–17
|align=left| Murazi Mchedlidze
|style="font-size:88%"|TF 13–0
|-
! style=background:white colspan=7 |
|-
|Win
|62–17
|align=left| Aslanbek Sotiev
|style="font-size:88%"|5–0
|style="font-size:88%" rowspan=5|10–15 March 2021
|style="font-size:88%" rowspan=5|2021 Russian National Championships
|style="text-align:left;font-size:88%;" rowspan=5|
 Ulan-Ude, Buryatia
|-
|Win
|61–17
|align=left| Khokh Khugaev
|style="font-size:88%"|TF 10–0
|-
|Win
|60–17
|align=left| Azret Shogenov
|style="font-size:88%"|TF 10–0
|-
|Win
|59–17
|align=left| Asadula Ibragimov
|style="font-size:88%"|5–2
|-
|Win
|58–17
|align=left| Georgy Gogaev
|style="font-size:88%"|Fall
|-
! style=background:white colspan=7 |
|-
|Win
|64–17
|align=left| Georgii Rubaev
|style="font-size:88%"|6–0
|style="font-size:88%" rowspan=3|12–18 December 2020
|style="font-size:88%" rowspan=3|2020 Individual World Cup
|style="text-align:left;font-size:88%;" rowspan=3|
 Belgrade, Serbia
|-
|Win
|63–17
|align=left| Arkadzi Pahasian
|style="font-size:88%"|TF 10–0
|-
|Win
|62–17
|align=left| Samuel Scherrer
|style="font-size:88%"|7–2
|-
! style=background:white colspan=7 |
|-
|Win
|61–17
|align=left| Magomed Kurbanov
|style="font-size:88%"|3–2
|style="font-size:88%" rowspan=4|15–18 October 2020
|style="font-size:88%" rowspan=4|2020 Russian National Championships
|style="text-align:left;font-size:88%;" rowspan=4|
 Naro-Fominsk, Moscow Oblast
|-
|Win
|60–17
|align=left| Anzor Urishev
|style="font-size:88%"|4–0
|-
|Win
|59–17
|align=left| Yuri Ivanov
|style="font-size:88%"|9–0
|-
|Win
|58–17
|align=left| Gadzhimagomed Nazhmudinov
|style="font-size:88%"|5–1
|-
! style=background:white colspan=7 |
|-
|Loss
|57–17
|align=left| Batyrbek Tsakulov
|style="font-size:88%"|3–6
|style="font-size:88%" rowspan=4|23–26 January 2020
|style="font-size:88%" rowspan=4|Golden Grand Prix Ivan Yarygin 2020
|style="text-align:left;font-size:88%;" rowspan=4|
 Krasnoyarsk, Krasnoyarsk Krai
|-
|Win
|57–16
|align=left| Anzor Urishev
|style="font-size:88%"|TF 12–1
|-
|Win
|56–16
|align=left| Abdimanap Baigenzheyev
|style="font-size:88%"|TF 10–0
|-
|Win
|55–16
|align=left| Tsogtgerel Munkhbaatar
|style="font-size:88%"|Fall
|-
! style=background:white colspan=7 |
|-
|Win
|54–16
|align=left| Sharif Sharifov
|style="font-size:88%"|5–2
|style="font-size:88%" rowspan=3|29–30 November 2019
|style="font-size:88%" rowspan=3|2019 Alrosa Cup Prix
|style="text-align:left;font-size:88%;" rowspan=3|
 Moscow, Russia
|-
|Win
|53–16
|align=left| Reineris Salas
|style="font-size:88%"|7–6
|-
|Win
|52–16
|align=left| Anzor Urishev
|style="font-size:88%"|5–3
|-
! style=background:white colspan=7 |
|-
|Loss
|51–16
|align=left| Magomed Kurbanov
|style="font-size:88%"|1–6
|style="font-size:88%" rowspan=4|24–28 October 2019
|style="font-size:88%" rowspan=4|2019 Vladimir Semenov's Ugra Cup
|style="text-align:left;font-size:88%;" rowspan=4|
 Nefteyugansk, Russia
|-
|Win
|51–15
|align=left| Alan Bagaev
|style="font-size:88%"|TF 11–0
|-
|Win
|50–15
|align=left| Tazhudin Mukhtarov
|style="font-size:88%"|TF 11–0
|-
|Win
|49–15
|align=left| Vsevolod Grigoryev
|style="font-size:88%"|TF 10–0
|-
! style=background:white colspan=7 |
|-
|Win
|48–15
|align=left| Georgii Rubaev
|style="font-size:88%"|3–2
|style="font-size:88%" rowspan=4|20–21 September 2019
|style="font-size:88%" rowspan=4|2019 World Championships
|style="text-align:left;font-size:88%;" rowspan=4|
 Nur-Sultan, Kazakhstan
|-
|Loss
|47–15
|align=left| Alireza Karimi
|style="font-size:88%"|TF 0–10
|-
|Win
|47–14
|align=left| Süleyman Karadeniz
|style="font-size:88%"|4–3
|-
|Win
|46–14
|align=left| Ivan Yankouski
|style="font-size:88%"|8–1
|-
! style=background:white colspan=7 |
|-
|Win
|45–14
|align=left| Magomed Kurbanov
|style="font-size:88%"|2–1
|style="font-size:88%" rowspan=5|4–8 July 2019
|style="font-size:88%" rowspan=5|2019 Russian National Championships
|style="text-align:left;font-size:88%;" rowspan=5|
 Sochi, Russia
|-
|Win
|44–14
|align=left| Anzor Urishev
|style="font-size:88%"|5–4
|-
|Win
|43–14
|align=left| Radik Nartikoev
|style="font-size:88%"|4–1
|-
|Win
|42–14
|align=left| Tsedashi Dugarov
|style="font-size:88%"|TF 10–0
|-
|Win
|41–14
|align=left| Magomedmurad Baibekov
|style="font-size:88%"|4–0
|-
! style=background:white colspan=7 |
|-
|Loss
|40–14
|align=left| Sharif Sharifov
|style="font-size:88%"|4–7
|style="font-size:88%" rowspan=4|1–3 May 2019
|style="font-size:88%" rowspan=4|2019 Ali Aliev Memorial International
|style="text-align:left;font-size:88%;" rowspan=4|
 Kaspiysk, Dagestan
|-
|Win
|40–13
|align=left| Ivan Yankouski
|style="font-size:88%"|3–1
|-
|Win
|39–13
|align=left| Anzor Urishev
|style="font-size:88%"|7–5
|-
|Win
|38–13
|align=left| Javid Sadigov
|style="font-size:88%"|TF 10–0
|-
! style=background:white colspan=7 |
|-
|Win
|37–13
|align=left| Süleyman Karadeniz
|style="font-size:88%"|4–0
|style="font-size:88%" rowspan=2|16–17 March 2019
|style="font-size:88%" rowspan=2|2019 World Cup
|style="text-align:left;font-size:88%;" rowspan=2|
 Yakutsk, Sakha
|-
|Win
|36–13
|align=left| Atsushi Matsumoto
|style="font-size:88%"|TF 10–0
|-
! style=background:white colspan=7 |
|-
|Win
|35–13
|align=left| Danan Xu
|style="font-size:88%"|INJ
|style="font-size:88%" rowspan=4|24–27 January 2019
|style="font-size:88%" rowspan=4|Golden Grand Prix Ivan Yarygin 2019
|style="text-align:left;font-size:88%;" rowspan=4|
 Krasnoyarsk, Krasnoyarsk Krai
|-
|Loss
|34–13
|align=left| Ulziisaikhan Baasantsogt
|style="font-size:88%"|TF 0–12
|-
|Loss
|34–12
|align=left| Magomed Kurbanov
|style="font-size:88%"|0–3
|-
|Win
|34–11
|align=left| Batyrbek Tsakulov
|style="font-size:88%"|7–3
|-
! style=background:white colspan=7 |
|-
|Win
|33–11
|align=left| Irakli Mtsituri
|style="font-size:88%"|6–0
|style="font-size:88%" rowspan=4|7–9 December 2018
|style="font-size:88%" rowspan=4|2018 Alans International
|style="text-align:left;font-size:88%;" rowspan=4|
 Vladikavkas, North Ossetia–Alania
|-
|Loss
|32–11
|align=left| Magomed Kurbanov
|style="font-size:88%"|5–6
|-
|Win
|32–10
|align=left| Muslim Magomedov
|style="font-size:88%"|Fall
|-
|Win
|31–10
|align=left| Magomedgadzhi Khatiyev
|style="font-size:88%"|TF 12–2
|-
! style=background:white colspan=7 |
|-
|Win
|30–10
|align=left| Ahmed Bataev
|style="font-size:88%"|4–0
|style="font-size:88%" rowspan=3|23–26 November 2018
|style="font-size:88%" rowspan=3|2018 Akhmat Kadyrov Cup
|style="text-align:left;font-size:88%;" rowspan=3|
 Grozny, Chechnya
|-
|Loss
|29–10
|align=left| Sharif Sharifov
|style="font-size:88%"|TF 2–13
|-
|Win
|29–9
|align=left| Chinbat Altangerel
|style="font-size:88%"|TF 12–0
|-
! style=background:white colspan=7 |
|-
|Loss
|28–9
|align=left| Azamat Zakuev
|style="font-size:88%"|1–3
|style="font-size:88%"|15–19 November 2018
|style="font-size:88%"|2018 Intercontinental Cup
|style="text-align:left;font-size:88%;"|
 Khasavyurt, Dagestan
|-
! style=background:white colspan=7 |
|-
|Loss
|28–8
|align=left| Sharif Sharifov
|style="font-size:88%"|4–6
|style="font-size:88%" rowspan=3|14–16 September 2018
|style="font-size:88%" rowspan=3|2018 Alexandr Medved Prizes
|style="text-align:left;font-size:88%;" rowspan=3|
 Minsk, Belarus
|-
|Win
|28–7
|align=left| Magomed Kurbanov
|style="font-size:88%"|5–0
|-
|Win
|27–7
|align=left| Ivan Yankouski
|style="font-size:88%"|INJ (4–0)
|-
! style=background:white colspan=7 |
|-
|Win
|26–7
|align=left| Guram Chertkoev
|style="font-size:88%"|TF 10–0
|style="font-size:88%" rowspan=5|3–5 August 2018
|style="font-size:88%" rowspan=5|2018 Russian National Championships
|style="text-align:left;font-size:88%;" rowspan=5|
 Odintsovo, Moscow Oblast
|-
|Win
|25–7
|align=left| Sharap Alikhanov
|style="font-size:88%"|TF 10–0
|-
|Loss
|24–7
|align=left| Anzor Urishev
|style="font-size:88%"|4–4
|-
|Win
|24–6
|align=left| Ahmed Hasanov
|style="font-size:88%"|TF 10–0
|-
|Win
|23–6
|align=left| Yuri Ivanov
|style="font-size:88%"|TF 10–0
|-
! style=background:white colspan=7 |
|-
|Win
|22–6
|align=left| Kanzula Magomedov
|style="font-size:88%"|TF 10–0
|style="font-size:88%" rowspan=3|10–14 May 2018
|style="font-size:88%" rowspan=3|2018 Ali Aliev Memorial International
|style="text-align:left;font-size:88%;" rowspan=3|
 Kaspiysk, Dagestan
|-
|Loss
|21–6
|align=left| Aslanbek Alborov
|style="font-size:88%"|1–4
|-
|Win
|21–5
|align=left| Baasantsegt Ulzisaikhan
|style="font-size:88%"|TF 11–0
|-
! style=background:white colspan=7 |
|-
|Win
|20–5
|align=left| Chinbat Altangerel
|style="font-size:88%"|TF 10–0
|style="font-size:88%" rowspan=4|10–11 March 2018
|style="font-size:88%" rowspan=4|2018 Prix of Buryatia Republic's President
|style="text-align:left;font-size:88%;" rowspan=4|
 Ulan-Ude, Buryatia
|-
|Loss
|19–5
|align=left| Anzor Urishev
|style="font-size:88%"|2–6
|-
|Win
|19–4
|align=left| Abubakar Turgayev
|style="font-size:88%"|Fall
|-
|Win
|18–4
|align=left| Abdimanap Baigenzheyev
|style="font-size:88%"|TF 11–0
|-
! style=background:white colspan=7 |
|-
|Win
|17–4
|align=left| Azamat Dauletbekov
|style="font-size:88%"|8–7
|style="font-size:88%" rowspan=4|25 November 2017
|style="font-size:88%" rowspan=4|2017 U23 World Championships
|style="text-align:left;font-size:88%;" rowspan=4|
 Bydgoszcz, Poland
|-
|Win
|16–4
|align=left| Raman Chytadze
|style="font-size:88%"|TF 10–0
|-
|Win
|15–4
|align=left| Uri Kalashnikov
|style="font-size:88%"|TF 10–0
|-
|Win
|14–4
|align=left| Alireza Karimi
|style="font-size:88%"|TF 14–3
|-
! style=background:white colspan=7 |
|-
|Win
|13–4
|align=left| Zbigniew Baranowski
|style="font-size:88%"|5–4
|style="font-size:88%" rowspan=4|12–13 October 2017
|style="font-size:88%" rowspan=4|2017 Intercontinental Cup
|style="text-align:left;font-size:88%;" rowspan=4|
 Khasavyurt, Dagestan
|-
|Win
|12–4
|align=left| Amarhajy Mahamedau
|style="font-size:88%"|3–2
|-
|Win
|11–4
|align=left| Aleksander Gostiev
|style="font-size:88%"|Fall
|-
|Win
|10–4
|align=left| Sebastian Jezierzański
|style="font-size:88%"|6–3
|-
! style=background:white colspan=7 |
|-
|Loss
|9–4
|align=left| Dauren Kurugliev
|style="font-size:88%"|PP
|style="font-size:88%" rowspan=4|23 November 2017
|style="font-size:88%" rowspan=4|2017 Akhmat Kadyrov Cup
|style="text-align:left;font-size:88%;" rowspan=4|
 Grozny, Chechnya
|-
|Win
|9–3
|align=left| Rashid Kurbanov
|style="font-size:88%"|8–2
|-
|Loss
|8–3
|align=left| Zbigniew Baranowski
|style="font-size:88%"|3–6
|-
|Win
|8–2
|align=left| Dinislambek Taalaibek Uulu
|style="font-size:88%"|TF 10–0
|-
! style=background:white colspan=7 |
|-
|Win
|7–2
|align=left| Aleksander Gostiev
|style="font-size:88%"|5–1
|style="font-size:88%" rowspan=4|6–10 July 2017
|style="font-size:88%" rowspan=4|2017 Ali Aliev Memorial International
|style="text-align:left;font-size:88%;" rowspan=4|
 Kaspiysk, Dagestan
|-
|Win
|6–2
|align=left| Tamerlan Akhmedov
|style="font-size:88%"|10–4
|-
|Win
|5–2
|align=left| Elkhan Asadov
|style="font-size:88%"|Fall
|-
|Win
|4–2
|align=left| Suleyman Omarov
|style="font-size:88%"|8–0
|-
! style=background:white colspan=7 |
|-
|Loss
|3–2
|align=left| Arsen-Ali Musalaliev
|style="font-size:88%"|Fall
|style="font-size:88%" rowspan=5|14 June 2017
|style="font-size:88%" rowspan=5|2017 Russian National Championships
|style="text-align:left;font-size:88%;" rowspan=5|
 Nazran, Ingushetia
|-
|Win
|3–1
|align=left| Magomed Kurbanov
|style="font-size:88%"|8–4
|-
|Loss
|2–1
|align=left| Vladislav Valiev
|style="font-size:88%"|TF 0–11
|-
|Win
|2–0
|align=left| Umakhan Magomedkhanov
|style="font-size:88%"|4–2
|-
|Win
|1–0
|align=left| Muslim Magomedov
|style="font-size:88%"|TF 10–0
|-

References

External links 
 

Living people
Russian male sport wrestlers
World Wrestling Championships medalists
1994 births
European Wrestling Champions
Sportspeople from Makhachkala
21st-century Russian people